Troy Boswell (born May 23, 1966), known professionally as Leroy Troy, is an old-time banjo player from Goodlettsville, Tennessee.  His banjo style is the clawhammer or frailing style, distinct from more commonly found Scruggs style banjo playing in modern bluegrass. He often performs humorous or comedy songs from the old-time music genre. Troy often uses a washboard with various sound making devices affixed to it. The "Bicycle Wreck" song is often played by Troy on the washboard. Major musical influence attributed to Uncle Dave Macon and others taught by him. Troy debuted on the Grand Ole Opry in 1988 and was the National Old-Time Banjo Champion in 1996.

Troy is known as "the Tennessee Slicker" and "The Sultan of Goodlettsville" and plays with the Tennessee Mafia Jugband and Marty Stuart, appeared weekly on The Marty Stuart show on RFD-TV.

References

1966 births
Living people
American banjoists
People from Goodlettsville, Tennessee
Country musicians from Tennessee